Johnny Wolford (birth registered third ¼ 1945) is an English former professional rugby league footballer who played in the 1960s, 1970s and 1980s, and coached in the 1980s.

Background
Johnny Wolford's birth was registered during third ¼ 1945 in Wakefield district, West Riding of Yorkshire, England.

Playing career

Premiership Final appearances
Johnny Wolford played  and scored a drop goal in Bradford Northern's 17–8 victory over Widnes in the 1977–78 Rugby League Premiership Premiership Final during the 1977–78 season at Station Road, Swinton, Pendlebury on Saturday 20 May 1978, in front of a crowd of 16,813.

County Cup Final appearances
Johnny Wolford played as an interchange/substitute, i.e. number 14, (replacing  Ian Slater) in Bradford Northern's 18–8 victory over York in the 1978–79 Yorkshire County Cup Final during the 1978–79 season at Headingley Rugby Stadium, Leeds on Saturday 28 October 1978, in front of a crowd 10,429.

BBC2 Floodlit Trophy Final appearances
Johnny Wolford played  and scored two-goals/conversions in Bramley's 15–7 victory over Widnes in the 1973 BBC2 Floodlit Trophy Final during the 1973–74 season at Naughton Park, Widnes on Tuesday 18 December 1973, in fornt of a crowd of 4,542.

Club career
Johnny Wolford made his début for Bramley aged-16, in the 12–18 defeat by Hunslet in the Eastern Division Championship match at Barley Mow, Bramley on Saturday 29 September 1962, he scored his first try for Bramley in the 19–2 victory over Doncaster, he was Bramley's record try scorer (extended by Jack Austin during the 1976–77 season), he transferred from Bramley to Bradford Northern, he transferred from Bradford Northern to Dewsbury, he transferred from Dewsbury to Hunslet, he appeared in 35 of the 38 matches, 34 of the 38 matches contributed to Hunslet's promotion to the First Division during the 1983–84 season, and he played his last match for Hunslet against Doncaster during 1985.

References

External links
Great names gather to reminisce about good old RL days

Search for "John Wolford" at britishnewspaperarchive.co.uk
Search for "Johnny Wolford" at britishnewspaperarchive.co.uk

1945 births
Living people
Bradford Bulls players
Bramley RLFC players
Dewsbury Rams players
English rugby league players
Hunslet R.L.F.C. coaches
Hunslet R.L.F.C. players
Rugby league centres
Rugby league five-eighths
Rugby league fullbacks
Rugby league halfbacks
Rugby league locks
Rugby league players from Wakefield
Yorkshire rugby league team players